The Hardenburg on the eastern edge of the Palatinate Forest near the Rhineland-Palatinate town of Bad Dürkheim is even as a ruin one of the mightiest castles of Palatinate.

Literature

References

External links 

 Kreisstadt Bad Dürkheim: Burg Hardenburg
 Burgen in Rheinland-Pfalz: Burg Hardenburg 
 Wolfgang Braun: Rekonstruktionszeichnung 

Castles in Rhineland-Palatinate